Martyn Farr (born Crickhowell, Wales, March 3, 1951) is a leading exploratory cave diver and caver, known for his record-breaking cave dives and the exploration of many miles of previously undiscovered underground passages (e.g. in Ogof y Daren Cilau and Noon's Hole). As an author and photographer he has written many books on the subject of cave diving history and techniques and caving locations.

Life and career 
Farr began caving in 1961 and cave diving in 1971, and within 10 years had established a world record for underwater cave penetration in the Bahamas. He is noted within the cave diving community for his explorations in Wookey Hole in 1977 and 1982, and for completing the first traverse of Llangattock Mountain in Wales in 1986, the execution of which was a televised media event, being the longest and deepest caving through trip in the British Isles. In 1978, Farr discovered also the Pollatoomary cave in the Partry Mountains of the Republic of Ireland.

As well as running a cave diving training facility in South Wales, Farr is a regular contributor to diving magazines around the world.

Farr is the author of The Darkness Beckons, regarded as the definitive book on the history of UK cave diving.
TDI instructor.

Bibliography

The Darkness Beckons - The History And Development Of Cave Diving (1980)
The Great Caving Adventure (1984)
Wookey: The Caves Beyond (1985)
Darkworld - The Secrets Of Llangattock Mountain (1997)
The Secret World Of Porth yr Ogof (1998)
Dan yr Ogof: The Jewel Of Welsh Caves (1999)
Underground Wales (2001)
Diving In Darkness - Beneath Rock, Under Ice, Into Wrecks (2003)

See also

References

External links 
 Official Website

Living people
1951 births
British cavers
British underwater divers
Cave diving explorers
People from Crickhowell
Welsh explorers
Pioneering technical divers